Trichopilia tortilis is a species of orchid found from Mexico to Central America. It is the type species of the genus Trichopilia.

References

tortilis
Orchids of Mexico
Orchids of Central America